Frank Charles Wachter (September 16, 1861 – July 1, 1910) was an American politician and Congressman from Maryland.

Biography
Born in Baltimore, Maryland to German immigrants, Wachter attended private schools and St. Paul's Evangelical School at Baltimore.  He learned the trade of cloth cutting and in 1892 engaged in the cloth-shrinking business.  He served as a member of the jail board of Baltimore from 1896 to 1898, and was an unsuccessful candidate for police commissioner of Baltimore in 1898.

Wachter was elected as a Republican to the Fifty-sixth and to the three succeeding Congresses, serving from March 4, 1899 to March 3, 1907.  He was not a candidate for renomination in 1906, and resumed his former business pursuits in Baltimore.  He served as a member of the board of managers of Maryland Penitentiary from 1909 until his death in Baltimore.  He is interred in Loudon Park Cemetery.

References

1861 births
1910 deaths
American Lutherans
American people of German descent
Republican Party members of the United States House of Representatives from Maryland
19th-century American politicians
19th-century Lutherans